Silvio Hernández del Valle (December 31, 1908 – March 20, 1984) was a Mexican basketball player who competed in the 1936 Summer Olympics. Born in Veracruz, he was part of the Mexican basketball team, which won the bronze medal. He played in two matches.

References

External links
Silvio Hernández's profile at databaseOlympics
XI JUEGOS OLIMPICOS BERLIN 1936 BRONCE | EQUIPO DE BALONCESTO 

1908 births
1984 deaths
Basketball players at the 1936 Summer Olympics
Mexican men's basketball players
Olympic basketball players of Mexico
Olympic bronze medalists for Mexico
Olympic medalists in basketball
Basketball players from Veracruz
People from Veracruz (city)
Medalists at the 1936 Summer Olympics